"Trouble on the Line" is a song written by Mark Miller and Bill Shore, and recorded by American country music group Sawyer Brown.  It was released in March 1993 as the third single from the album Cafe on the Corner.  The song reached number 5 on the Billboard Hot Country Singles & Tracks chart.

Chart performance

Year-end charts

References

1993 singles
Sawyer Brown songs
Curb Records singles
1992 songs
Songs written by Mark Miller (musician)
Songs written by Bill Shore